Meluin de Leon (born 26 December 1968) is a Dominican Republic boxer. He competed in the men's flyweight event at the 1988 Summer Olympics.

References

1968 births
Living people
Dominican Republic male boxers
Olympic boxers of the Dominican Republic
Boxers at the 1988 Summer Olympics
Place of birth missing (living people)
Flyweight boxers